Kirkland is a small village near the A5086 road, in the Copeland district, in the English county of Cumbria. The nearest town is Cleator Moor.

The Bible Christian chapel was built when Cornish tin-miners relocated to the iron ore workings in West Cumbria. It replicates the Bible Christian Chapels in Devon & Cornwall. The Bible Christians amalgamated into the Methodist Movement in the early 20th century. This chapel was 'revived' and used until the mid-1990s. It was sold to a speculative 'developer' around 1999 and has lain desolate and untouched.

Amenities 
Kirkland has a place of worship Kirkland Mission Church.

References 

Philip's Street Atlas (page 78)

Villages in Cumbria
Borough of Copeland